Shand is a surname of Scottish descent, also spelt Schawand, Schaand, Schande and Schand. It may refer to:

People
 Adam Shand (journalist) (born 1962), Australian writer and journalist
 Adam Shand (manager), New Zealand visual effects operations manager and advocate of community wireless networks, founder of Personal Telco
 Alexander Shand, 1st Baron Shand (1828–1904), Scottish advocate and judge
 Alexander Faulkner Shand (1858–1936), English writer and barrister
 Bob Shand (1866–1934), South African international rugby union player
 Bruce Shand (1917–2006), British Army major, father of Camilla, Queen Consort
 Camilla Shand (born 1947), maiden name of Camilla, Queen Consort
 David Shand (born 1956), Canadian ice hockey defenseman
 David Shand (bishop) (1921–2011), Australian Anglican bishop
 Donald Shand (1904–1976), Australian grazier and founder of East-West Airlines
 Elspeth Shand (b. 1932), maiden name of Elspeth Howe, Baroness Howe of Idlicote, British crossbencher life peer
 Ernest Shand (1868–1924), Victorian guitarist and composer
 Hector Shand (1879–1942), Scottish footballer
 James Shand (1870–1944), Australian politician
 Jimmy Shand (1908–2000), Scottish musician who played traditional Scottish dance music
 John Shand (1834–1914) Scottish mathematician who emigrated to New Zealand to be a professor at Dunedin
 Mark Shand (1951–2014), British travel writer, brother of Camilla, Queen Consort
 Neil Shand (1934–2018), British television comedy writer
 Philip Morton Shand (1895–1960), English architect, design critic and wine and food writer, grandfather of Camilla, Queen Consort
 Phyllis Shand Allfrey (1915–1986), née Shand, West Indian writer, socialist activist, newspaper editor and politician of Dominica
 Remy Shand (born 1978), Canadian R&B/soul singer
 Richard Shand (1916–1965), New Zealand cricketer
 Ron Shand (1906–1993), Australian actor and comedian
 Samuel James Shand (1882–1957), British geologist
 Tom Shand (1911–1969), New Zealand Member of Parliament
 Tonia Shand (1939–2020), Australian diplomat and public servant

Fictional characters
 Shand (View from the Mirror), in Ian Irvine's The View from the Mirror novels
 Fennec Shand, a bounty huntress in the Star Wars universe

See also
 Eric Loudoun-Shand (1893–1972), rugby union player 
 Stewart Loudoun-Shand VC (1879–1916), British Army major and recipient of the Victoria Cross
 William A. Shands (1889–1973), American politician
 Shand Mason, British fire engine manufacturer

Surnames